Mao Buyi (born 1 October 1994), legally Wang Weijia, is a Chinese singer and songwriter.

Mao Buyi rose to prominence for winning the all-male singing competition The Coming One in 2017. He released his debut album Perfect Day in 2018, and achieved two No. 1's on the Billboard China singles chart in 2019. In 2020, he released his second debut album Xiao Wang (小王). He also held an online concert in the same year. In 2021, he released his third debut album Lonely Planet (幼鸟指南).

Early life
Mao Buyi, whose legal name is Wang Weijia, was born in October 1994 in Tailai County, Qiqihar, in Heilongjiang province of Northeast China. He studied nursing at Hangzhou Normal University and began his internship at a hospital in Hangzhou in 2016, his last year in university. In the same year, he started to put pen to paper and wrote songs. To "ease the pressure" from work, which he found stressful, he decided to learn how to play guitar, and the first song he composed was for his sister who got married. Also, he kept this music interest and wrote new songs in his dormitory prior to appearing on The Coming One.

Personal life 
Mao was born to civil servant parents who had him at a relatively older age. He stated that his parents did not put much pressure on him compared to his peers and only had the expectation that he "live a happy, good life". During his nursing career, he regularly dealt with deceased patients but his mother was the first person whose death he witnessed first-hand; after her death, he would still send messages to her WeChat number to honor her memory.

Performing experience

2017
Mao first came to attention after appearing as a contestant on the Tencent Video singing competition The Coming One. He was noted for standing out from the other contestants, who wore costumes and makeup, for his "normality" and "round face, large glasses, and slightly crooked teeth". He also had very little prior experience in music. He had to record his introduction three times due to technical glitches, broke a guitar string as he began playing, and gawked at the celebrity judges when he first saw them, which was considered to have contributed to his appeal amongst the public. The media began referring to him as "cute sang", a nod to the apparent lack of ambition and apathy among Chinese youth, and the Mandarin slang word for "frightened". In contrast to the "typical" songs about romance, Mao sang songs about "hopelessness, frustrated ambition, and his dreams of getting rich"; the title of his first song in the competition translates to "If I Become Very Rich One Day", which he wrote when he was working as a nursing intern and short of money.

He won the competition on September 23, 2017, and "Xiao Chou" (消愁; Get Rid of Blues), his song which debuted during the competition, later stayed at the top of the QQ Music chart for 11 days and was streamed over 500 million times. He then embarked on a three-date tour of Shanghai, Beijing, and Chengdu from September 22 to November 17, which was attended by 300,000 people.

2018
On January 18, Mao won the New Music Power Award of Weibo Awards Ceremony.

On May 31, 2018, Mao released his debut album Perfect Day, produced by the singer Li Jian, which was streamed and downloaded over one million times on its first day of release. The album was also a critical success in China, with several critics noting its natural and warm qualities, as well as Mao's "poetic lyrics and melancholy melodies".

On August 29, Mao won the Chinese song music festival's most popular new artist of the year award and best new artist of the year award, while the song Get Rid of Blues (消愁) won the golden song of the year award.

On November 29, Mao won the Most Promising Male Singer Award and the Best Singer-Songwriter of the Year Award at the Asian Music Awards.

2019
In 2019, Billboard China launched the Billboard China Top 100, which is compiled based on radio play, streaming, and digital sales in mainland China. Mao has spent five weeks of the year so far at number one with his 2017 songs "People Like Me" and "Get Rid of Blues".

2020
In January 2020, Mao joined Hunan TV's music competition program Singer as a debut singer.

On January 22, Mao released his second debut music album Xiao Wang (小王).

In August, 2020, Mao ranked 79th on Forbes China Celebrity 100 list.

On December 31, Mao participated in CCTV New Year's Gala "Sailing 2021"; and he participated in "2020 Most Beautiful Night bilibili Gala", jointed presented by CCTV and Bilibili.

2021 
On June 26, 2021, Mao released his third album Lonely Planet (幼鸟指南), produced by Arai Soichiro.

On December 14, 2021, Mao's theme song for the movie "I Am What I Am", "Nobody" (无名的人), went online.

On July 16 and July 23, Mao participated in "Back To Field" for thee 4th time and sang "In This Mountain", a track from the album Lonely Planet, at the concert of the final episode of season 5 broadcast on July 23.

Social activities 
On September 11, 2018, Mao attended the 6th season of Charity Stars-To Dream Designer ceremony and Luohu Fashion Night as a public welfare promotion ambassador, and hand-painted an "art dream bag" with Han Geng and Shen Mengchen to call for more attention to children's aesthetic education in poor areas; on November 2, Mao was invited to be the "EU-China Tourism Year Ambassador".

On May 5, 2020, Mao participated in the "Believe in the Future" charity show and sang "Perfect Day"(平凡的一天).

In July 2021, Mao participated in CCTV's "Together with You" charity show and sang "Perfect Day"(平凡的一天) in tribute to the heroes of ordinary people.

In July 2021, Mao donated 500,000 RMB to the disaster area in Henan Province.

Figure evaluation 
Mao's first impression given to people is that he is an introvert, and he has been called "Younger Li Zongsheng" and "Chinese version of Bob Dylan". Mao's lyrics are a combination of parallelism and simplicity, and his lyrics have a maturity beyond his age, and his perception of life is particularly insightful. Mao has a unique music style and infectious songwriting, in the "Day Day Up" program, he appeared in a blue and black sweater, and his previous on-stage stability formed a contrast of youthful teenage sense. The original song "People Like Me" was performed live by Mao, and his low voice and unique "Mao-style singing" made him the highlight of the stage as soon as he opened his mouth, while his originality is his greatest charm.

Discography
Albums
 Perfect Day 平凡的一天 (2018)
 Xiao Wang 小王 (2020)
 Lonely Planet 幼鸟指南 (2021)

References

1994 births
Living people
21st-century Chinese male singers
Chinese male singer-songwriters
Singers from Heilongjiang
People from Qiqihar
Hangzhou Normal University alumni